González is a Spanish surname, the second most common (2.16% of the population) in Spain, as well as one of the five most common surnames in Argentina, Chile, Mexico, Paraguay, and Venezuela, and one of the most common surnames in the entire Spanish-speaking world. As of 2017, it is the 13th most common surname in the United States.

Origin
González is a Spanish name. Its origins trace back to a Visigothic name combining the words gunþo(guntho) (battle or war) and alf (elf); the Latinized form was Gundisalv. As the Spanish language developed, the name transformed into Gonzálo and its surname derivative González. Some believe the name to mean "war hall", as evidenced by the castle in a field of blood on its family crest and the Visigothic cultural origins of the nation of Spain. González is also taken to mean "son of Gonzalo", "noble warrior", "soldier" or "castle guard". Common spellings include: Gonzalez (no acute accent), Gonzáles, Gonzales, Gonzalés, González and Goncalves. The variant Consolus appears among people descended from a Spaniard with the surname Gonsález who settled in the Dutch colony of New Amsterdam.

Geographical distribution
As of 2014, 31.8% of all known bearers of the surname González were residents of Mexico (frequency 1:44), 10.8% of Spain (1:49), 10.0% of Venezuela (1:34), 7.4% of Argentina (1:66), 7.1% of the United States (1:584), 6.7% of Colombia (1:81), 5.1% of Cuba (1:26), 4.2% of Chile (1:48), 3.1% of Paraguay (1:27), 2.7% of Guatemala (1:68), 1.7% of Panama (1:27), 1.7% of Nicaragua (1:42), 1.4% of the Dominican Republic (1:85), 1.1% of El Salvador (1:67) and 1.1% of Ecuador (1:171).

In Spain, the frequency of the surname was higher than national average (1:49) in the following autonomous communities:
Asturias (1:20)
Canary Islands (1:22)
Castile and León (1:29)
Cantabria (1:30)
Galicia (1:33)
Extremadura (1:36)
Andalusia (1:49)

In Cuba, the frequency of the surname was higher than national average (1:26) in the following provinces:
Artemisa (1:18)
Cienfuegos (1:19)
Mayabeque (1:19)
Ciego de Ávila (1:19)
Matanzas (1:24)
Sancti Spíritus (1:24)
Isla de la Juventud (1:24)
Pinar del Río (1:25)
Villa Clara (1:25)
Santiago de Cuba (1:25)

People named González

The arts
 Adrian Gonzales
 Adrián Luis González
 Antonio González Caballero
 Eva Gonzalès
 Fernando González Gortázar
 Francisco González Gómez
 Jaime Guadalupe González Domínguez
 Jorge González Camarena
 Jose B. Gonzalez
 José Emilio González
 Jose Luis Gonzalez (artist)
 José González (artist)
 Juan Gonzalez (artist)
 Julio González (sculptor)
 Manuel Gonzales
 Marcelina Gonzales
 Mercedes Elena Gonzalez 
 Suzy González
 Xavier Gonzalez

Film, television, and theater
 Alejandro González Iñárritu
 Álvaro Díaz González
 Anthony Gonzalez (actor)
 Beauty Gonzalez
 Bianca Gonzalez
 Carlos González (cinematographer)
 Charlene Gonzales
 Daniel Brühl (born Daniel César Martín Brühl González)
 Danny Gonzalez
 Edith González
 Eiza González
 Erich Gonzales
 Fernando González Pacheco
 Flor Elena González
 Juan González (journalist)
 Laura G (María Sonia Laura González Martínez)
 Luis Gonzales
 Luis Gonzalez, a character in Chiquititas
 Luz Elena González
 Mandy Gonzalez
 Mauricio González de la Garza
 Mónica González (dancer)
 Myrtle Gonzalez
 Nicandro Díaz González
 Nicholas Gonzalez
 Pedro González (humorist)
 Pedro Gonzalez Gonzalez
 Raúl González (host)
 Rick Gonzalez
 Robert Gant (Robert Gonzalez)
 Speedy Gonzales
 Susana González
 Víctor González (actor)
 Yon González
 Nacho Vidal (Ignacio Jordi González)

Literature
 Ángel González Muñiz
 Dulce María González
 Enrique González Martínez
 Enrique González Rojo Sr.
 Enrique González Rojo Jr.
Enriqueta González Rubín
 Fernando González (writer)
 Francisco González Bocanegra
 José Antonio González de Salas
 José Luis González (writer)
 Juan Ignacio González del Castillo
 Manuel González Zeledón
 Maria Teresa Maia Gonzalez
 Oscar Gonzáles (writer)

Music
 Alex González (musician)
 Andrew Gonzales, past drummer of Reel Big Fish
 Anthony Gerard Gonzalez, vocalist of M83
 Babs Gonzales 
 Chilly Gonzales
 Danny Gonzalez 
 Dennis González
 Emilio González Gabarre, member of Los Chichos
 Enrique González "La Pulga"
 Fernando González Casellas
 Guillermo Gonzalez (pianist)
 Iván González, past keyboard player of Maná
 Jaslene Gonzalez
 Jorge González (musician)
 Jorge González (singer)
 José González (singer)
 José Luis González (composer)
 Juan de Marcos González
 Julio González Gabarre, member of Los Chichos
 Luis "Checho" González
 Nelson González
 Quique González
 Roberto González-Monjas
 Rockdrigo González
 Rodrigo González (musician)
 Rubén González (pianist)
 Scheila Gonzalez
 Siddhartha (musician)
 Yann Gonzalez, past member of M83

Catholic Church
 Alexia González-Barros González
 Antonio González (martyr)
 Conchita, Jacinta and Mari Cruz González, girls that claimed to have witnessed apparitions in Garabandal
 José González Rubio
 José Higinio Gómez González
 Manuel González García (bishop)
 Peter González

Crime
 Adrián Gómez González
 Albert Gonzalez
 Daniel Gonzalez (spree killer)
 Fernando González, one of the Cuban Five
 Gustavo González Castro
 José González Valencia
 Julio González
 Sef Gonzales

Military
 Alfredo Cantu Gonzalez
 Ambrosio José Gonzales
 Antonio González de Balcarce
 Juan Picasso González
 Pedro González Llamas

Other fields
 Alberto González (humorist) (1928–2012), Cuban humorist and iconoclast
 Alberto Jose González (born 1972), Spanish video game graphic artist, music composer and designer
 Ambrose E. Gonzales (1857–1926), Cuban-American co-founder of The State newspaper
 Andrew Gonzalez (1940–2006), Filipino linguist, writer, educator, and Lasallian Brother
 Christine Gonzalez, first woman train engineer for Class1 railroad
 Clotilde González de Fernández (1880-1935), Argentine educator, writer
 Elián González (born 1993), Cuban child who was the center of a custody battle
 Felipe González de Ahedo (1702–1792), Spanish navigator and cartographer
 Felipe González de Canales, one of the founders of Escuelas Familiares Agrarias
 Fernán González of Castile, First autonomous count of Castile
 Fernando González de Traba Galician nobleman
 Gilberth González, served as the executive director and member of the board of the Interamerican Scout Foundation
 Gómez González (died October 26, 1111), Castilian nobleman
 Gómez González de Manzanedo (died 1182), Castilian magnate
 Gómez González de Traba Galician nobleman
 Inés González Árraga (born 1973), Venezuelan political prisoner
 Jesús Rodríguez Gonzáles (1939–1995), Cuban chess player
 José Eleuterio González (1813–1888), Mexican physician and philanthropist
 José Manuel González-Paramo (born 1958), Spanish economist
 José Ramón González, Puerto Rican businessman
 Juan González de Mendoza, Spanish sinologist
 Justo L. González, Theologian, author
 Laura González (Miss Colombia), Miss Colombia
 Luis Eduardo González (1945–2016), Uruguayan political scientist, sociologist and polling specialist
 Luis González Palma (born 1957), Guatemalan photographer
 Luis González y González (1925–2003), Mexican historian
 Manuel Críspulo González y Soto (1846–1933), Spanish entrepreneur and philanthropist
 Marianne Cruz Gonzalez, Dominican Republic beauty contest model
 Mauricio González-Gordon y Díez (1923–2013), Spanish sherry maker and conservationist
 Mauricio González Sfeir (born 1956), Bolivian businessman
 Mike Gonzalez (historian) (born 1943), British historian and literary critic
 Narciso Gener Gonzales (1858–1903), Cuban-American co-founder of The State newspaper
 Pedro González de Lara, Spanish noble and statesman
 Pedro González de Mendoza (1428–1495), Spanish cardinal and statesman
 Raul Gonzalez (journalist), Filipino journalist, and columnist
 Rodrigo González de Lara, Castilian nobleman of the House of Lara
 Rolando Gonzalez-Bunster (born ), US-based Argentine businessman
 Víctor González Torres (born 1947), Mexican businessman
 William Elliott Gonzales (1866–1937), United States Ambassador
 X González (born 1999), American activist and advocate for gun control
 Zack Peter, (Zack Gonzalez, born 1993), American comedian, author, and activist

Politics and law
 Abraham González (governor)
 Alberto Gonzales
 Alicia García-Salcedo González
 Antonio González, 1st Marquess of Valdeterrazo
 Antonio González de Aguilar, 8th Marquess of la Vega de Armijo
 Arely Gómez González
 Cecilia González Gómez
 Charlie Gonzalez
 Edgar González Jr.
 Enrique Cárdenas González
 Enrique González Pedrero
 Enrique Parejo González
 Ervin A. Gonzalez
 Felipe González
 Felipe González González
 Fernando González Laxe
 Fernando González Roa
 Francisco González de la Vega
 Henry B. González
 Henry C. Gonzalez
 Iván Hernández González
 Jorge Emilio González Martínez
 Jorge González Otero
 Jorge González Torres
 Jorge González von Marées
 Jose Alejandro Gonzalez Jr.
 José Antonio González Caviedes
 José Emilio González Velázquez
 José González Gallo
 José González Morfin
 José González Ortiz
 José Soberanis González
 Juan Manuel González Torres
 Julio Gonzalez (Florida politician)
 Justin Gonzales
 Lorena Gonzalez (California politician)
 Lorena González (Seattle politician)
 Luis A. Gonzalez (judge)
 Luis González-Bravo y López de Arjona
 Luis Gonzales Posada
 Luis Enrique Oberto González (1928–2022), Venezuelan politician
 Manuel González Prada
 Manuel González-Hontoria y Fernández-Ladreda
 Matt Gonzalez
 Miguel González Avelar
 Pedro Miguel González Pinzón
 Raul M. Gonzalez
 Ron Gonzales
 Servando Ruiz-Gómez y González-Llanos
 Sixto Agudo González
 Stalin González
 Steven González
 Tony Gonzales
 Vicente Gonzalez

Presidents
 Emiliano González Navero, 20th president of Paraguay 1908–1910
 José Maldonado González, last president of the Spanish Republican government in exile
 Juan Gualberto González, 11th president of Paraguay 1890–1894
 Santiago González Portillo, 14th president of El Salvador 1871–1876
 Juan Natalicio González, 37th president of Paraguay 1948–1949
 Luis Ángel González Macchi, 46th president of Paraguay 1999–2003
 Luis Arturo González López, Acting president of Guatemala 1957
 Manuel González Flores, 31st President of Mexico 1880–1884
 Gabriel González Videla, President of Chile 1946–1952

Science and technology
 Alberto González Domínguez, mathematician
 Guillermo Gonzalez (astronomer)
 Guillermo González Camarena, inventor of color TV
 Ingrid del Carmen Montes González, chemist
 Jean-Paul Gonzalez, virologist
 José González-Lander, engineer
 Juan E. González, microbiologist
 Paula González, environmentalist
 Pilar González i Duarte, chemist

Sports
 Ángel Martín González (chess player)
 Fernando González (athlete), Paralympian
 Fernando Gonzalez (fighter), martial artist
 Gilberto González (triathlete)
 Iván González (canoeist)
 José González García, chess
 José Manuel González, Paralympian
 Mayra González, rower
 Mike Gonzales, decathlete
 Raúl González (handballer)
 Reynaldo Vera González-Quevedo, chess
 Richard Gonzales (table tennis)
 Tomás González (gymnast)
 Juan González de Vega, chess

American (gridiron) football
 Anthony Gonzalez (politician)
 Christian Gonzalez
 Dan Gonzalez
 Joaquin Gonzalez (American football)
 Steve Gonzalez (American football)
 Tony Gonzalez
 Zane Gonzalez

Association football (soccer)
 Adrián González (footballer, born 1976)
 Adrián González (footballer, born 1995)
 Adrián González (Spanish footballer)
 Alberto González Cespedosa
 Alberto González Gonzalito
 Alberto González Pérez
 Alberto Mario González
 Alfredo Razon Gonzalez
 Álvaro Rafael González
 Aníbal González
 Antonio González Álvarez
 Campanal I (Guillermo González del Río García)
 Carlos Gonzales
 Cristian Gonzáles
 Daniel González Calvo
 Darwin González
 Édgar González (Mexican footballer)
 Édgar Daniel González
 Elkin González
 Enrique González Casín
 Enrique Ramos González
 Fernando González (footballer, born 1989)
 Fernando González Valenciaga
 Fernando Rubén González
 Fran (footballer, born 1969)
 Germán González Blanco
 Guillermo Gonzalez (soccer)
 Hernán González
 Hugo González (Chilean footballer)
 Iván Emmanuel González
 Iván Garrido González
 Iván González López
 Javier González Gómez
 Javier Mercedes González
 Jorge Alfredo Gonzalez
 Jorge Hernández González
 José Francisco González
 José González Ganoza
 José González Joly
 José Ignacio González
 José Joel González
 José Luis González China
 José Luis González Dávila
 José Manuel González Hernández
 José Manuel González López
 Juan Carlos González
 Juan Carlos González (Chilean footballer)
 Juan Cruz González
 Juan Diego González
 Juan Diego González-Vigil
 Juan González (Uruguayan footballer)
 Juan González Calderón
 Juan Luis González
 Juanito (footballer, born 1954)
 Julio César González Trinidad
 Julio Gómez González
 Julio González Montemurro
 Julio José González
 Julio Raúl González
 Julio Valentín González
 Kily González
 Lorena González (footballer)
 Lucho González
 Luis Gonzalez (soccer, born 1989)
 Mágico González
 Manuel González (footballer, born 1917)
 Manuel González (footballer, born 1929)
 Manuel González (footballer, born 1943)
 Manuel González (footballer, born 1953)
 Manuel González (footballer, born 1991)
 Mariano Fernando González
 Mariano González
 Mark Anthony Gonzalez
 Mark González
 Marvin González
 Mauricio Ernesto González
 Migue (Miguel Ángel González González)
 Miguel Ángel González (Argentine footballer)
 Miguel Ángel González Suárez
 Miguel González (footballer, born 1990)
 Miguel Gonzalez (soccer)
 Mónica González (soccer)
 Óscar Nadin Díaz González
 Pancho Gonzales (footballer)
 Pedro González (Peruvian footballer)
 Pedro González Pierella
 Pedro González Vera
 Raúl (footballer)
 Raúl Alberto González
 Raul Gonzalez (soccer)
 Raúl González Guzmán
 Raúl González Robles
 Rónald González Brenes
 Ronald González Tabilo
 Sebastián González
 Sebastián González (Argentine footballer)
 Steve Gonzalez
 Toni González
 Yordi (Jorge González Díaz)
 Irome González

Baseball
 Adrián González, brother of Edgar Gonzalez (the infielder)
 Alberto González (baseball)
 Alex Gonzalez (shortstop, born 1973)
 Álex González (shortstop, born 1977)
 Andy González (baseball)
 Carlos González (baseball)
 Chi Chi Gonzalez
 Dan Gonzales
 Denny González
 Dicky Gonzalez
 Edgar Gonzalez (infielder), brother of Adrian Gonzalez
 Édgar González (pitcher)
 Enrique González (baseball)
 Erik González
 Eusebio González
 Fernando González (baseball)
 Fredi González
 Gabe González
 Geremi González
 Germán González
 Gio González
 Joe Gonzales (baseball)
 José González (baseball)
 Juan González (baseball)
 Julio González (pitcher)
 Julio González (infielder)
 Lariel González
 Larry Gonzales
 Luis González (infielder)
 Luis Gonzalez (outfielder, born 1967)
Luis Fernando González Hoenig (born 1995), baseball outfielder for the San Francisco Giants
 Luis González
 Marco Gonzales
 Marwin González
 Merandy González
 Miguel Alfredo González
 Miguel González (catcher)
 Miguel González (pitcher)
 Mike González (catcher)
 Mike Gonzalez
 Orlando González
 Oscar González (baseball)
 Pedro González (baseball)
 Raúl González (baseball)
 Rene Gonzales
 Romy González
 Tony González (baseball)
 Vince Gonzales
 Wiki González

Basketball
 Bobby Gonzalez
 Ixhelt González
 José González (basketball)
 Miguel González (basketball)

Boxing
 Enrique González (boxer)
 Jorge Luis González
 Julio César González
 Julio González (Cuban boxer)
 Larry Gonzáles
 Luis González (Chilean boxer)
 Luis González (Venezuelan boxer)
 Mario González (Mexican boxer)
 Miguel Ángel González (boxer)
 Miguel González (Mexican boxer)
 Miguel González (Paraguayan boxer)
 Raúl González (boxer)

Cycling
 Adrián González (cyclist)
 Alejandro González (cyclist)
 Alexander González (cyclist)
 Chepe González
 Fredy González
 Javier Alberto González
 José Antonio González (cyclist)
 Juan Fierro
 Juan González (cyclist)
 Luis Alberto González
 Pedro González (cyclist)
 Rónald González (cyclist)
 Víctor Hugo González
 Vladimir González

Fencing
 Alberto González (fencer)
 Enrique González (fencer)
 Julio González (fencer)
 Manuel González (fencer)

Hockey
 Amanda González
 Antonio González (field hockey)
 María Cruz González

Javelin
 Antonio González (javelin thrower)
 Ramón González (athlete)

Judo
 Fernando González (judoka)
 Juan González (judoka)

Racing
 Javier González (racing driver)
 José Froilán González
 Juan Manuel González Corominas

Rugby
 Laura González (rugby union)
 Lucas González Amorosino

Shooting
 Jorge González (sport shooter)
 José González (Mexican sport shooter)
 José González (Puerto Rican sport shooter)
 José González (Spanish sport shooter)
 Manuel González (sport shooter)

Swimming
 Erika González
 Fernando González (swimmer)
 Hugo González (swimmer)
 Jorge González (swimmer)
 José González (Spanish swimmer)
 Luis González (swimmer)
 Mario González (swimmer)
 Rodrigo González (swimmer)

Tennis
 Fernando González
 Francisco González (tennis)
 Máximo González
 Pancho Gonzales
 Santiago González (tennis)

Track and Field
 Griselda González, long-distance runner
 Guillermo González (athlete), sprinter
 Iglandini González, long-distance runner
 Iván Darío González, middle- and long-distance runner
 Jermaine Gonzales, runner
 Jorge González (athlete), Olympic runner
 Jorge González (Spanish athlete), middle-distance runner
 José Antonio González (athlete), race walker
 José Luis González (runner), middle- and long-distance runner
 Luis Javier González, middle-distance runner
 Manuel González (athlete), Olympic sprinter
 Mariela González, marathon
 Mauricio González (athlete), long-distance runner
 Mayra González (athlete), sprinter
 Radamés González, marathon
 Raúl González (racewalker)
 Tomás González (sprinter)

Volleyball
 Fernando González (volleyball)
 José Luis González (volleyball)
 Juan González (volleyball)
 Juana González

Wrestling
 Dr. Wagner (Manuel González Rivera)
 El Hijo del Diablo (Juan Carlos Gonzales)
 Jorge González (wrestler)
 José González (wrestler)

See also
 Gonçalves, Portuguese equivalent of Gonzalez
 Gonsales, Portuguese variation of Gonzalez
 Gonsalves, English variation of Gonçalves
 Gonzales (disambiguation), Spanish variation of Gonzalez
 Gonzalez (disambiguation)

References

Spanish-language surnames
Surnames of Spanish origin
Patronymic surnames
Surnames from given names
Surnames of Honduran origin
Surnames of Salvadoran origin
Surnames of Filipino origin
Surnames of Guatemalan origin
Surnames of Colombian origin
Surnames of Uruguayan origin